.sx is the country code top-level domain (ccTLD) in the Domain Name System of the Internet for Sint Maarten.

Sint Maarten became an autonomous country within the Kingdom of the Netherlands on October 10, 2010. On December 15, 2010, the ISO 3166 Maintenance Agency allocated SX as the ISO 3166-1 alpha-2 code for Sint Maarten, as other possible combinations such as .sm, .ma, and .mt had already been allocated.

The sx top-level domain is run on the CIRA Fury Registry Platform. Registrars of sx domains must be accredited by the registry.

After an initial sunrise period to claim trademarked names, and registration periods for local priority, and landrush assignments the registry opened general availability registrations to the public on 15 November 2012. A local presence is not required of domain name registrants.

Registration phases
Grandfather period to protect Sint Maarten holders of AN domain names ended May 2, 2012.
Sunrise period to protect trademark holders was conducted from May 3 to July 4, 2012.
Local Sint Maarten corporate and personal priority periods were from July 5 to September 4, 2012.
Landrush period was from September 5 to October 4, 2012.
General availability period during which anyone may register a SX domain name started November 15, 2012

See also
 Internet in the Netherlands
 Internet in the Netherlands Antilles
 ISO 3166-2:SX
 .nl –CC TLD for the Netherlands
 .an –CC TLD for former Netherlands Antilles federation
 .eu –CC TLD for the European Union
 .mf, the ccTLD proposed for Saint Martin, the French side of the island.

References

External links
 IANA .sx whois information
 SX Registry

Country code top-level domains
Communications in Sint Maarten